Liam Matthew Graham (born 14 August 1992) is a New Zealand professional footballer who plays for Auckland City and the New Zealand national team.

Graham was born in Melbourne, Australia. He played youth football with Vicenza before making his professional debut with Ascoli in 2013. In 2014, Graham signed with Monza and subsequently played for Pro Patria on loan.

Early life
Graham was born in Melbourne, Australia, but spent his youth moving throughout Australia, Singapore, New Zealand and Japan. He started playing football aged five.

Club career

Vicenza
Graham signed for Serie B club Vicenza in 2010 after an eight-day trial with the side. He played two seasons for the side's youth team in the Campionato Nazionale Primavera.

Ascoli
On 10 August 2012, Graham signed a senior contract with Ascoli. He made his competitive debut for the side in a loss to Hellas Verona in the 2012–13 Serie B, coming on for Róbert Feczesin after 77 minutes.

Graham missed the 2013–14 season after tearing his anterior cruciate ligament at the beginning of the season and was left without a contract. After his recovery, he spent the final months of the season training with Savona.

Monza
In 2014, Graham signed with Monza before being loaned out to Pro Patria in the Lega Pro. Graham's debut came in September 2014, starting in a 2–0 loss to Südtirol.

Chesterfield
In October 2015, Graham joined Football League One club Chesterfield. He joined National League South Whitehawk on loan in March 2016. Graham suffered another anterior cruciate ligament knee injury in November 2016, which kept him out for the remainder of the season.

Auckland City
Graham returned to New Zealand in September 2017, signing with Auckland City.

International career
In April 2011, Graham was called up to the New Zealand U-20 squad for the 2011 OFC U-20 Championship. He made his debut off the bench in a group stage win over Solomon Islands, coming on for Marco Rojas after 79 minutes. New Zealand won the tournament, beating Solomon Islands in the final and qualifying for the 2011 FIFA U-20 World Cup.

In September 2016, Graham received his first call-up to the New Zealand national team for a tour of North America. He made his debut in a 2–1 friendly loss to Mexico.

Career statistics

Honours

International
 New Zealand national football team
 OFC U-20 Championship: 2011

See also
 List of foreign Serie B players

External links

References

Whitehawk F.C. players
Living people
1992 births
Association football defenders
New Zealand association footballers
New Zealand international footballers
New Zealand under-20 international footballers
Soccer players from Melbourne
Australian expatriate soccer players
Australian expatriate sportspeople in Italy
New Zealand expatriate association footballers
New Zealand expatriate sportspeople in Italy
Expatriate footballers in Italy
A.C. Monza players
Aurora Pro Patria 1919 players
Ascoli Calcio 1898 F.C. players
L.R. Vicenza players
Auckland City FC players
Serie B players
Serie C players
New Zealand Football Championship players